The New York City Department of Correction (NYCDOC) is the branch of the municipal government of New York City responsible for the custody, control, and care of New York City's imprisoned population, housing the majority of them on Rikers Island. It employs 8,949 uniformed officers and 2,027 civilian staff, has 543 vehicles, and processes over 100,000 new inmates every year, retaining a population of inmates of between 3,000 and 6,000. Its nickname is New York's Boldest. Its regulations are compiled in title 39 of the New York City Rules.

Previously located in Manhattan, the Department of Correction headquarters is now located in the Bulova building in East Elmhurst, Queens, close to Rikers Island. The agency is headed by the Correction Commissioner, who is chosen and appointed by the Mayor of New York City.

History

The New York City Department of Correction was first founded as a separate entity in New York City in 1895 after a split from the Department of Public Charities and Correction. Roosevelt Island, then called Blackwell's Island, was the main penal institution under the jurisdiction of the DOC until the 1930s when it was closed. The penal institutions moved to Rikers Island, which the city purchased for $180,000, where 10 prisons and 6,000 inmates are now held.

Historians have not described the prison system of New York in the 19th century in a favorable light - with employment positions being awarded based on the spoils system and employees being characterized as largely corrupt. The Blackwell's Island penitentiary is described as having lax security, where prisoners were able to escape if they knew how to swim.

In 1995, the New York City jail system was one of the most violent in the United States, averaging more than 100 stabbings and slashings per month. Between January 1995 and January 2002, the department achieved a 93% reduction in inmate on inmate violence as a result of a management system recognized by Harvard University's John F. Kennedy School of Government, called Total Efficiency Accountability Management System (TEAMS). By 2007, the number of stabbings was reduced to 19, making that year the Department of Correction's safest on record, although the issue of underreporting of incidents has not been addressed.

In 2009, former commissioner of both the Missouri and Arizona prison systems Dora Schriro was selected to head the department, with some citing a need in the department for a boost in morale. Schriro was named in several federal court cases such as Schriro v. Smith and Schriro v. Summerlin. Schriro served with the United States Department of Homeland Security prior to coming to the department.

Responsibilities
Correction officers are responsible for the care, control, custody, work performance and job training of inmates. Duties include:
 Inspecting facilities for safety and security, and safeguarding supplies and equipment.
 Supervising meals, recreation, and visitors.
 Maintaining logs.
 Interacting with inmates, and recommending medical and/or psychiatric referrals. 
 Escorting and transporting inmates within and outside of the facility.

Command structure
There are nine titles (referred to as ranks) in the New York City Department of Correction.

From highest to lowest, the uniformed ranks are:

There are certain civilian leadership positions in the agency which have power equivalent to the high ranking uniformed personnel. If they outrank a present uniformed officer, they are saluted due to agency customs and courtesies.

From highest to lowest, the civilian leadership ranks are: 

The Commissioner is the highest-ranking official in the agency and is in command of all uniformed and civilian personnel.

Equipment and vehicles

Firearms
Correction officers are trained in the use of a firearm, but are only armed on certain post assignments due to the potential threat of prisoners overpowering an officer. On duty firearm is provided (Smith & Wesson 5946 DAO) however should the member elect there is a list of authorized firearms such as Glock pistol. For officers hired before March 1994, the model 10 & 64 revolvers are still used. 

Correction officers are New York State Peace Officers  with authority to make warrantless arrests, issue summonses, carry and use a firearm & can optionally carry a firearm off duty after 6 month service & written permission from Commanding officer. Officers' options include their duty firearm or Glock 26 for off duty use.

Vehicles

The department uses numerous marked vehicles including Chevrolet Impalas, Ford vans, transport buses, fire trucks, and riot vehicles. They share the distinctive NYC Law Enforcement colour scheme of blue-and-white, with the NYCD patch, red-white-blue/yellow (rear) flashing lights and sirens.

Facilities
Rikers Island is the main correctional facility.

Horizon Juvenile Center serves as the juvenile facility. The final juvenile inmates on Rikers Island were moved to Horizon in 2018. The move was prompted by a law passed by New York state in 2017 requiring that juvenile inmates under 18 be housed separately from adults.

Notable employees
Sharon Jones served as a corrections officer at Rikers Island.
Bernard Kerik, Served in the NYCDOC from 1994 to 2001, Kerik became Correction Commissioner after retiring from the NYPD as a detective. 
Anna M. Kross Commissioner from 1953 to 1966. Developed the NYC Corrections R&D arm to research recidivism methods. She campaigned for legislation to treat addicts and alcoholics as people with medical rather than criminal conditions. Second woman to hold the position. 
Mickey Marcus, Commissioner in 1940 - Would go on to serve in World War II with the United States Army and later join the Israeli Defense Force and be instrumental in leading their forces during that country's independence movement.
Anthony S. Seminerio Former State Assemblyman
Leo C. Zeferetti  Former US Congressman

See also

 Corrections
 List of jail facilities in New York City
 List of law enforcement agencies in New York
 New York City Board of Correction
 New York State Department of Corrections and Community Supervision
 New York City Department of Probation
 Roosevelt Island

References

External links
 Official Website
 Department of Correction in the Rules of the City of New York

1895 establishments in New York City
Government agencies established in 1895
Correction
Prison and correctional agencies in the United States
Penal system in New York (state)
Law enforcement agencies of New York City
 
East Elmhurst, Queens